Nawan Killi is a village and union council in Mardan District of Khyber Pakhtunkhwa.
 It has an altitude of 291 m (958 feet).

References

Union councils of Mardan District
Populated places in Mardan District